Kalleguta is a small village on the island of Öland, Sweden. It lies in the inland of the island. It belongs to Borgholm Municipality.

External links 
Site of the municipality

Populated places in Borgholm Municipality
Öland